Iraklis (Greek: Ηρακλής) may refer to several sports clubs and other topics in Greece named after the mythological hero Heracles:

G.S. Iraklis Thessaloniki, a sports club based in Thessaloniki
Iraklis Larissa, a football club in Larissa
Iraklis Psachna F.C., a football club in Psachna, Euboea
Iraklis (cement), a Greek cement manufacturer

See also: 
Heracles (disambiguation)
Hercules (disambiguation)